Paradoliops is a genus of beetles in the family Cerambycidae, containing the following species:

 Paradoliops cabigasi Vives, 2009
 Paradoliops humerosa (Heller, 1921)

References

Apomecynini